The 2020–21 daytime network television schedule for the five major English-language commercial broadcast networks in the United States covers the weekday and weekend daytime hours from September 2020 to August 2021. The schedule is followed by a list per network of returning series; no new series, but only one series is canceled after the 2019–20 season are included at present, as the daytime schedules of the four major networks that offer morning and/or afternoon programming is expected to remain consistent with the prior television season.

Affiliates fill time periods not occupied by network programs with local or syndicated programming. PBS – which offers daytime programming through a children's program block, PBS Kids – is not included, as its member television stations have local flexibility over most of their schedules and broadcast times for network shows may vary. Also not included are MyNetworkTV (as the programming service also does not offer daytime programs of any kind), and Ion Television (as its schedule is composed mainly of syndicated reruns). Fox does not air network programming on weekdays. This is the last season in which The CW (which does not carry programming on Sunday mornings or afternoons) would program a daytime hour on weekdays.

Legend

Schedule
 New series are highlighted in bold.
 All times correspond to U.S. Eastern and Pacific Time scheduling (except for some live sports or events). Except where affiliates slot certain programs outside their network-dictated timeslots, subtract one hour for Central, Mountain, Alaska, and Hawaii-Aleutian times.
 Local schedules may differ, as affiliates have the option to pre-empt or delay network programs. Such scheduling may be limited to preemptions caused by local or national breaking news or weather coverage (which may force stations to tape delay certain programs in overnight timeslots or defer them to a co-operated station or digital subchannel in their regular timeslot) and any major sports events scheduled to air in a weekday timeslot (mainly during major holidays). Stations may air shows at other times at their preference.
All sporting events airs live in all time zones in U.S. Eastern time, with local programming by affiliates in western time zones after game completion.

Weekdays
{| class="wikitable"
! colspan="2" width="1.5%" bgcolor="#C0C0C0" align="" text center |Network
! width="4%" bgcolor="#C0C0C0" text align center|7:00 am
! width="4%" bgcolor="#C0C0C0" text align center|7:30 am
! width="4%" bgcolor="#C0C0C0" text align center|8:00 am
! width="4%" bgcolor="#C0C0C0" text align center|8:30 am
! width="4%" bgcolor="#C0C0C0" text align center|9:00 am
! width="4%" bgcolor="#C0C0C0" text align center|9:30 am
! width="4%" bgcolor="#C0C0C0" text align center|10:00 am
! width="4%" bgcolor="#C0C0C0" text align center|10:30 am
! width="4%" bgcolor="#C0C0C0" text align center|11:00 am
! width="4%" bgcolor="#C0C0C0" text align center|11:30 am
! width="4%" bgcolor="#C0C0C0" text align center|noon
! width="4%" bgcolor="#C0C0C0" text align center|12:30 pm
! width="4%" bgcolor="#C0C0C0" text align center|1:00 pm
! width="4%" bgcolor="#C0C0C0" text align center|1:30 pm
! width="4%" bgcolor="#C0C0C0" text align center|2:00 pm
! width="4%" bgcolor="#C0C0C0" text align center|2:30 pm
! width="4%" bgcolor="#C0C0C0" text align center|3:00 pm
! width="4%" bgcolor="#C0C0C0" text align center|3:30 pm
! width="4%" bgcolor="#C0C0C0" text align center|4:00 pm
! width="4%" bgcolor="#C0C0C0" text align center|4:30 pm
! width="4%" bgcolor="#C0C0C0" text align center|5:00 pm
! width="4%" bgcolor="#C0C0C0" text align center|5:30 pm
! width="4%" bgcolor="#C0C0C0" text align center|6:00 pm
! width="4%" bgcolor="#C0C0C0" text align center|6:30 pm
! width="4%" bgcolor="#C0C0C0" text align center|7:00 pm
! width="4%" bgcolor="#C0C0C0" text align center|7:30 pm
|-
! colspan="2"|ABC
| bgcolor="gold" colspan="4"|Good Morning America
| bgcolor="white" colspan="4"|Local and/orsyndicated programming
| bgcolor="yellow" colspan="2"|The View
| bgcolor="white" colspan="2"|Local and/or syndicated programming
| bgcolor="gold" colspan="2"|GMA3: What You Need To Know
| bgcolor="chartreuse" colspan="2"|General Hospital*
| bgcolor="white" colspan="7" rowspan="2"|Local and/or syndicated programming
| bgcolor="gold" |ABC World News Tonight with David Muir
| bgcolor="white" colspan="2" rowspan="3" |Local and/or syndicated programming
|-
! colspan="2"|CBS
| bgcolor="gold" colspan="4"|CBS This Morning
| bgcolor="white" colspan="2"|Local and/or syndicated programming
| bgcolor="pink" colspan="2"|Let's Make a Deal*
| bgcolor="pink" colspan="2"|The Price Is Right| bgcolor="white"|Local and/or  syndicated programming
| bgcolor="chartreuse" colspan="2"|The Young and the Restless| bgcolor="chartreuse"|The Bold and the Beautiful| bgcolor="yellow" colspan="2"|The Talk| bgcolor="gold"|CBS Evening News with Norah O'Donnell|-
! colspan="2"|NBC
| bgcolor="gold" colspan="4"|Today| bgcolor="gold" colspan="2"|Today Third Hour| bgcolor="gold" colspan="2"|Today with Hoda & Jenna| bgcolor="white" colspan="4"|Local and/or syndicated programming
| bgcolor="chartreuse" colspan="2"|Days of Our Lives| bgcolor="white" colspan="9"|Local and/or syndicated programming
| bgcolor="gold"|NBC Nightly News with Lester Holt|-
! colspan="2"|The CW
| bgcolor="white" colspan="16"|Local and/or syndicated programming
| bgcolor="lightgray" colspan="2"|The Jerry Springer Show 
| bgcolor="white" colspan="8"|Local and/or syndicated programming
|}

Notes:
 ABC, CBS and NBC offer their early morning newscasts via a looping feed (usually running as late as 10:00 a.m. Pacific Time) to accommodate local scheduling in the westernmost contiguous time zones or for use a filler programming for stations that do not offer a local morning newscast; some stations without a morning newscast may air syndicated or time-lease programs instead of the full newscast loop.
 ABC stations have the option of airing General Hospital at 2:00 or 3:00 p.m. Eastern Time, depending on the station's choice of feed.
 Depending on their choice of feed, CBS stations have the option of airing Let's Make a Deal at either 10:00 a.m. or 3:00 p.m. Eastern (airtime adjusted by time zone), and/or The Young and the Restless at 11:00 or 11:30 a.m. local time (in the Central, Mountain, and Pacific time zones).
 NBC stations have the option of airing Days of Our Lives at varying airtimes (usually between Noon and 2:00 p.m. local time), depending on the station's preference and choice of feed. Days was pre-empted from July 26–August 6, 2021 due to the network's live coverage of the 2021 Summer Olympics from Tokyo, Japan.
 On May 13, 2021, The CW announced it would return the 3:00 p.m. slot to its affiliates effective September 6, in exchange for allowing the network to occupy the Saturday 8:00-10:00 p.m. ET/PT timeslot.

Saturday

Notes:
 (‡) ABC and Fox do not handle programming responsibilities for their programming blocks, but offers syndicated blocks of E/I-compliant programming that are intended for exclusive distribution to their stations. Litton's Weekend Adventure is offered to ABC stations by arrangement with Litton Entertainment and Xploration Station is offered to Fox stations by arrangement with Steve Rotfeld Productions.
 NBC may occasionally aired NBC Nightly News: Kids Edition on certain Saturdays; depending on the local station's scheduling at their discretion to fulfill the FCC educational programming requirements, and the program is not part of the network's The More You Know block.
 To comply with FCC educational programming regulations, stations may defer certain programs featured in their respective network's E/I program blocks to determined weekend late morning or afternoon time periods if a sporting event is not scheduled in the timeslot or in place of paid programming that would otherwise be scheduled.
 Airtimes of sporting events may vary depending on the offerings scheduled for that weekend (in which Fox or NBC could possibly air in the mornings on select weekends in which preempt E/I programming).

Sunday

Notes:
 To comply with FCC educational programming regulations, stations may defer certain programs featured in their respective network's E/I program blocks to determined weekend late morning or afternoon time periods if a sporting event is not scheduled in the timeslot or in place of paid programming that would otherwise be scheduled.
 Airtimes of sporting events may vary depending on the offerings scheduled for that weekend.

By network
ABC

Returning series:
ABC NewsABC World News TonightGMA3: What You Need To KnowGood Morning AmericaThis Week with George StephanopoulosESPN on ABCESPN College Basketball on ABCESPN College Football on ABCCollege Football ScoreboardESPN Major League SoccerNBA CountdownNBA Sunday ShowcaseGeneral HospitalLitton's Weekend Adventure‡Hearts of Heroes (shared with Go Time in First-run syndication)Ocean Treks with Jeff CorwinOh Baby! with Anji CorleyOutback Adventures with Tim Faulkner Rock the Park (shared with Go Time in First-run syndication)Sea Rescue The ViewNew series:
Litton's Weekend Adventure‡Free EnterpriseNot returning from 2019–20:
Litton's Weekend Adventure‡Jack Hanna's Wild Countdown XFLCBS

Returning series:
CBS Dream TeamAll In with Laila Ali Lucky DogThe Henry Ford's Innovation Nation with Mo RoccaHope in the WildMission Unstoppable with Miranda CosgrovePet Vet Dream TeamCBS NewsCBS Evening NewsCBS News Sunday MorningFace the NationCBS This MorningCBS This Morning SaturdayCBS SportsBig3 on CBSCollege Basketball on CBSCollege Football TodayCollege Football on CBSNFL on CBSPGA Tour on CBSThe NFL TodayLet's Make a DealThe Bold and the BeautifulThe Price Is RightThe TalkThe Young and the RestlessNot returning from 2019–20:
CBS Dream TeamBest Friends Furever with Kel Mitchell (moved to One Magnificent Morning)

Fox

Returning series:Fox News SundayFox SportsFox Big Noon KickoffFox Big Noon SaturdayFox College HoopsFox College Hoops TipoffFox NASCARFox NFL KickoffFox NFL SundayNASCAR RaceDayWeekend MarketplaceXploration Station‡Xploration Awesome PlanetXploration DIY SciXploration Nature Knows BestXploration Outer SpaceXploration Weird But TrueNew series:
Xploration Station‡Xploration Life 2.0Fox SportsTSL on FoxNot returning from 2019–20:XFL on FoxThe CW

Returning series:The Jerry Springer Show 
One Magnificent MorningJack Hanna's Into the WildJewels of the Natural WorldThis Old House: Trade SchoolNew series:
One Magnificent MorningTails of Valor (moved from CBS Dream Team) 

Not returning from 2019–20:
One Magnificent MorningChicken Soup for the Soul's Animal TalesDid I Mention Invention? with Alie Ward (moved to Go Time in First-run syndication)

NBC

Returning series:Days of Our LivesThe More You KnowA New Leaf The Champion Within with Lauren ThompsonEarth Odyssey with Dylan DreyerRoots Less TraveledVets Saving PetsNBC NewsTodaySunday Today with Willie GeistToday Third HourToday with Hoda & JennaMeet the PressNBC Nightly NewsNBC SportsNHL Game of the WeekPremier League on NBCGolf Channel on NBCNASCAR on NBCNASCAR AmericaNew series:
The More You KnowOne Team: The Power of SportsWild ChildNot returning from 2019–20:
The More You KnowConsumer 101 

Renewals and cancellations
Series renewals

ABCNHL on ESPN—It was announced on March 10, 2021 that its sister network ESPN will regained the rights to the National Hockey League games (including 25 games slated to air on ESPN and ABC) for seven years through the 2027–28 season.

FoxXFL on Fox—Renewed through the 2022 season on May 6, 2019. The league announced it would not play a 2021 season on October 1, 2020 but would return for the 2022 season.

NBCDays of Our Lives—Renewed for a 57th and 58th season (running through September 2023) on May 11, 2021.

Cancellations

The CWThe Jerry Springer Show—The network daytime run was meant to run for three seasons only. It concluded on September 17, 2021.

NBCNHL on NBC''—On April 26, 2021, It was announced that NBC had backed out of negotiations for the partial contractual rights of the remainder of the National Hockey League games (including the New Year's Day Winter Classic) and awarded the rights to Turner Sports beginning with the 2021–22 season and lasted through 2027–28 season.

Notes

See also
2020–21 United States network television schedule (prime-time)
2020–21 United States network television schedule (late night)

References

Sources
 
 
 

United States weekday network television schedules
2020 in American television
2021 in American television